Danville Township is an inactive township in Montgomery County, in the U.S. state of Missouri.

Danville Township takes its name from the community of Danville, Missouri.

References

Townships in Missouri
Townships in Montgomery County, Missouri